S. armata may refer to:
 Scorpaenopsella armata, a marine fish species
 Stephensia armata, a moth species found in Belize

See also
 Armata (disambiguation)